Abraham Phineas Grant (April 5, 1804 – December 11, 1871) was an American lawyer and politician who served one term as a U.S. Representative from New York from 1837 to 1839.

Biography 
Born in New Lebanon, New York, Grant attended the public schools and graduated from Hamilton College, Clinton, New York.  He then studied law, and was admitted to the bar in 1828.  He commenced practice in Oswego, New York, and served as district attorney of Oswego County in 1835.

Congress 
Grant was elected as a Democrat to the Twenty-fifth Congress (March 4, 1837 – March 3, 1839).  He resumed the practice of law.

Death 
He died in Oswego, New York, December 11, 1871.  He was interred in Riverside Cemetery.

References

1804 births
1871 deaths
People from New Lebanon, New York
Politicians from Oswego, New York
Hamilton College (New York) alumni
New York (state) lawyers
Oswego County District Attorneys
Democratic Party members of the United States House of Representatives from New York (state)
Burials in New York (state)
19th-century American politicians
19th-century American lawyers